77 Bullets is a 2019 Nigerian movie produced by Mercy Aigbe and directed by Adebayo Tijani. It is an action packed movie that stars Temitope Solaja, Ibrahim Yekini and Eniola Ajao.

Synopsis 
The movie tells the story of a ruthless armed robber who terrorises the community with the aid of her local charm. Eventually, she ran out of luck and she was apprehended.  The movie became twisted when the criminal had to face her twin in court as a judge.

Premiere 
The movie was first premiered on YouTube on  20 December 2019.

Cast 
Mercy Aigbe
Temitope Solaja 
Ibrahim Yekini
Eniola Ajao
Titi Osinowo
Bimbo Afolayan
Eniola Afeez
Taiwo Ibikunle
Adeniyi Johnson
Yinka Quadri

See also
 List of Nigerian films of 2019

References 

2019 films
Nigerian action thriller films
Nigerian action drama films